Avery Patterson is an American football safety who is a free agent in the National Football League (NFL). He was signed as an undrafted free agent by the Baltimore Ravens on May 12, 2014. He was cut by the team on June 20, 2014 after summer camp. He played college football at Oregon.

References

External links
Oregon Ducks bio

Living people
Year of birth missing (living people)
People from Pittsburg, California
Players of American football from California
Sportspeople from the San Francisco Bay Area
American football safeties
Oregon Ducks football players